Ziegler House may refer to:

Denmark
 Ziegler House, Copenhagen, a listed building

United States
Ziegler House (Ketchikan, Alaska), listed on the National Register of Historic Places
Ziegler House (Syracuse, New York), listed on the National Register of Historic Places
Isaac Ziegler House, in Knoxville, Tennessee
William Ziegler House, on East 63rd Street, New York City, New York
William and Helen Ziegler House, on East 55th Street, New York City, New York; renamed the SUNY Global Center, it is now the site of the Levin Institute of the State University of New York

See also
Zeigler House (disambiguation)
Ziegler Estate